The Gorom (formerly called Gorong) archipelago is a group of islands situated between the Watubela archipelago and Ceram in the Maluku Islands.

History
The Nagarakretagama, an Old Javanese eulogy to king Hayam Wuruk of Majapahit written in 1365, mentions "Gurun" amongst the tributary countries of the kingdom.

The English naturalist Alfred Russel Wallace described the islands, which he called Goram, in chapter 25 of his 1869 book The Malay Archipelago.

Islands
The archipelago has main three islands, plus a further 20-plus small offshore islands.
Gorom, the biggest island, with the villages of Miran (Miren) on the east coast, Ondor (Ondur) in the northwest and Hur on its southwestern coast. 
Panjang to the west of Gorong, with Wisalem village in its southern end.
Manawoku in the south, with the villages of Arbau in the north, Amar and Derra, and Nama in the south.

The islands now form three separate districts (kecamatan) within East Seram Regency of Maluku. Pulau Gorom District includes the western half of Gorom Island and the whole of Manawoku Island, plus some smaller islands; Gorom Timur District includes just the eastern half of Gorom Island; and Pulau Panjang District covers Panjang Island.

References

Archipelagoes of Indonesia
Populated places in Indonesia